U-70 is a proton synchrotron with a final energy of 70 GeV, built in 1967 at the Institute for High Energy Physics in Protvino (near Serpukhov, Russia). The accelerator held the world record in beam energy at the time of its construction, and it still is the highest energy accelerator in Russia. In 1970, the U-70 scientists team was awarded the Lenin Prize for the development and commissioning of the synchrotron.

Description of the accelerator complex 

The complex operates in pulsed mode. Protons are accelerated to 30 MeV by linear accelerator URAL-30. Then they are injected into the fast-cyclic booster synchrotron U-1.5 having 100-m perimeter, where protons are accelerated to 1.32 GeV. Then the protons are injected to the U-70. After this, an acceleration cycle takes place for 9 seconds, when protons are accelerated to the maximum energy of 76 GeV, and then, they are extracted from the ring to the secondary beams in the experimental halls. U-70 has perimeter about 1.5 km. Focusing structure type is FODO (strong focusing). The total weight of the magnetic system of over 20 000 t.

The prior injection of U-70 was a 100 MeV linear accelerator I-100 (until 1985).

A project for the UNK accelerator-storage complex, a proton-proton collider with an energy of 3 × 3 TeV, started in the mid 1980s. It was planned that U-70 becomes an injector for the collider ring, but the project was stopped because of the dissolution of the Soviet Union.

Accident
In 1978, Anatoli Bugorski stuck his head into the synchrotron to check a piece of malfunctioning equipment, when the safety mechanism failed and he got hit in the head with a proton beam. He reportedly saw "a flash brighter than a thousand suns", although no pain was reported.  Though he ultimately survived he did receive lifelong injuries to the left side of his face and experienced irregular bouts of epileptic seizures.

See also 
 Abram Alikhanov
 Quadrupole magnet
 Strong focusing

References

External links 
 U-70 accelerator branch. 

Particle accelerators
Science and technology in the Soviet Union